Race for the Bomb is a 1987 television 3-parts miniseries about the Manhattan Project, starting from the initial stages of scientific discovery that led to the creation of the atomic bomb, discovery of the Ulam-Teller thermonuclear weapons design and ending with the beginning of the arms race. The series was directed by Allan Eastman and Jean-François Delassus.

The production was a joint production of a Canadian firm, Ronald Cohen Productions, and a French firm, Société Philippe Dussart and former Yugoslavia - Jadran film, Zagreb. In Canada the series aired on both CBC Television in English and Télévision de Radio-Canada in French, while in France it aired on TF1.
A lot of collateral roles have been performed by former Yugoslavia actors.

The series covers the development of many aspects related to the origin of the bomb, such as scientific, political, and personal. It stars Tom Rack as Robert Oppenheimer, Maury Chaykin as Leslie Groves, Miki Manojlović as Edward Teller, Jean-Paul Muel as Leo Szilard, Michael Ironside as Werner Heisenberg and Leslie Nielsen as Lewis Strauss.

Muel received a Gemini Award nomination for Best Actor in a Drama Program at the 2nd Gemini Awards, and the French version was a Prix Gémeaux nominee for Best Miniseries.

References

External links

1987 Canadian television series debuts
1987 French television series debuts
1980s Canadian television miniseries
1980s French television miniseries
Films about nuclear war and weapons
Films about the Manhattan Project
Television series about the Manhattan Project
Nuclear history of the United States
Science docudramas
World War II television series
CBC Television original programming